There is a small Chinese community in Mali of about 3,000 people, mostly living in the capital of Bamako. However, their economic impact is prominent. The Chinese have opened wholesale businesses, retail shops, small hotels and construction firms. The Chinese immigrants are also visible in healthcare, having opened private medical clinics.

History
The first wave of Chinese immigrants in Mali appeared in the 1990s. 

The community was setback in 2005 when stores owned by Chinese were damaged and looted by rioters. However, the violence did not target Chinese and other neighborhood businesses were also attacked.

Integration and community
Local popular support for the presence of Chinese is high. However, there has been local concern over the robust level of competition from Chinese retailers and construction firms. Locals fear that although Chinese competition lowers the cost of goods, it also deprives nationals of business opportunities.

References

Mali
Ethnic groups in Mali